A Pale Tour Named Death was a concert tour by the Swedish rock band Ghost in support of their fourth studio album, Prequelle. Before the tour had been announced, two arena shows in Los Angeles, California, and New York City had been announced. The official tour was announced on 11 June 2018. It began on 9 September 2018 at the Royal Albert Hall in London, England, and concluded on 3 March 2020 at the Palacio de los Deportes in Mexico City, Mexico; the latter concert was dubbed A Final Gig Named Death.

Background
The tour featured lead singer Tobias Forge performing under the persona of "Cardinal Copia". Prior to the Copia persona, Ghost had been led by a succession of pope-like personas—Papa Emeritus I, Papa Emeritus II, and Papa Emeritus III—all played by Forge. For the Prequelle album, Forge took on the persona of Copia, who is portrayed as a cardinal, lowlier than the prior personas. At A Final Gig Named Death, Copia was promoted to "Papa Emeritus IV". As with previous tours, every concert on the tour saw Forge backed by a band of masked musicians known as "Nameless Ghouls".

A Pale Tour Named Death encompassed a number of legs, with concerts in North America, Europe, Australia and Japan. After the 9 September performance in London, the next show took place on 25 October 2018 at the Verizon Theatre in Grand Prairie, Texas; following the 25 August 2019 show at the Maimarktgelände exhibition site in Mannheim, Germany, it was announced that the tour would be extended into the fall, billed as The Ultimate Tour Named Death. This extension kicked off on 13 September 2019 at Bakersfield, California's Rabobank Arena, and concluded with A Final Gig Named Death.

Setlists

A Pale Tour Named Death setlist 
The following setlist was taken from 26 October 2018 performance at the Cox Business Center in Tulsa, Oklahoma, and may not be representative of all the shows on the tour.

Act 1
 "Ashes"
 "Rats"
 "Absolution"
 "Idolatrine"
 "Ritual"
 "Con Clavi Con Dio"
 "Per Aspera ad Inferi"
 "Devil Church"
 "Cirice"
 "Miasma"
 "Jigolo Har Meggido" (acoustic)
 "Pro Memoria"
 "Witch Image"
 "Life Eternal"

Act 2
 "Spirit"
 "From the Pinnacle to the Pit"
 "Majesty"
 "Satan Prayer"
 "Faith"
 "Year Zero"
 "Spöksonat" (taped)
 "He Is"
 "Mummy Dust"
 "If You Have Ghosts" (Roky Erickson cover)
 "Dance Macabre"
 "Square Hammer"
 "Monstrance Clock"

For the first show in London, "Deus in Absentia", "Stand By Him" and "Prime Mover" were performed. "Idolatrine" was dropped from the setlist on the European leg.

The Ultimate Tour Named Death setlist 
The following setlist was taken from 13 September 2019 performance at the Rabobank Arena in Bakersfield, California and may not be representative of all the shows on the tour.

 "Ashes"
 "Rats"
 "Absolution"
 "Faith"
 "Mary on a Cross"
 "Devil Church"
 "Cirice"
 "Miasma"
 "Ghuleh/Zombie Queen"
 "Helvetesfönster"
 "Spirit"
 "From the Pinnacle to the Pit"
 "Ritual"
 "Satan Prayer"
 "Year Zero"
 "Spöksonat" (taped)
 "He Is"
 "Mummy Dust"
 "Kiss the Go-Goat"
 "Dance Macabre"

Encore
 "Square Hammer"

A Final Gig Named Death setlist 
The following setlist was taken from 3 March 2020 performance at the Palacio de los Deportes in Mexico City, Mexico.

 "Ashes"
 "Rats"
 "Absolution"
 "Faith"
 "Mary on a Cross"
 "Devil Church"
 "Cirice" (Final song performance by Cardinal Copia)
 "Miasma" (Papa Nihil's final appearance; Papa Nihil collapses following saxophone solo)
 "Con Clavi Con Dio" (Papa Emeritus IV's live debut)
 "From the Pinnacle to the Pit"
 "Ritual"
 "Satan Prayer"
 "Year Zero"
 "Spöksonat" (taped)
 "He Is"
 "Mummy Dust"
 "Kiss the Go-Goat"
 "Dance Macabre"
 "Square Hammer"

Tour dates

Box office

References
Notes

References

Ghost (Swedish band) concert tours
2018 concert tours
2019 concert tours
2020 concert tours